Dominik Hrbatý was the defending champion, but did not participate this year.

Joachim Johansson won the title, defeating Taylor Dent 7–5, 6–3 in the final.

Seeds

Draw

Finals

Section 1

Section 2

External links
 Draw
 Qualifying draw

Singles